Cockaynea is a genus of grass in the family Poaceae.

Poaceae genera